The Black Pirates is a 1954 Ansco Color adventure film made by Salvador Films Corp. about a band of pirates scouring a small Central American town for a buried treasure. It was directed by Allen H. Miner and produced from a screenplay by Fred Freiberger and Al C. Ward based on the story by Johnston McCulley.

The film stars Anthony Dexter and Martha Roth with Robert Clarke, Toni Gerry and Lon Chaney Jr.

The tagline of the movie was "Wild Raiders of the Tropic Seas!". It was filmed on location in Panchimalco, El Salvador. Filming started in mid-June 1954 and the movie was released in December and distributed in Latin America under the title El Pirata Negro.

The Black Pirates was the first film that Cinema Research Corporation was hired to do the special effects for.

Plot
Pirates arrive in small town in Central America.  When they find a church in the spot they were expecting treasure, they enslave the townspeople to dig for that treasure.  But the pirates find there's more to be had than what they expected.

Cast
 Anthony Dexter as Capt. Zargo
 Martha Roth as Juanita
 Lon Chaney Jr. as Padre Felipe (as Lon Chaney)
 Robert Clarke as Manuel Azaga
 Víctor Manuel Mendoza as Castro
 Toni Gerry as Carlotta Luisa Maria Viego
 Alfonso Bedoya as Garza
 Jorge Treviño as (as George Trevino)
also starring
 Francisco Reiguera
 Eddie Dutko	
 Clai Simmons
 Laura Roth
 Jerry St. John

References

External links
 

Pirate films
1954 films
1954 adventure films
Lippert Pictures films
American adventure films
1950s English-language films
1950s American films